Caroline Ellison (born 1994) is an American former business executive and quantitative trader. She is the former CEO of Alameda Research, the trading firm affiliated with the cryptocurrency exchange FTX. 

According to an anonymous source cited by the Wall Street Journal in November 2022, Alameda Research owed $10 billion to FTX. The source said FTX had lent the trading firm money from customer funds at FTX.

Ellison was terminated from her position after FTX and Alameda filed for bankruptcy. In December 2022, Ellison pleaded guilty to two counts of wire fraud, two counts of conspiracy to commit wire fraud, conspiracy to commit securities fraud and conspiracy to commit money laundering.

Early life and education 
Ellison was born in Boston and grew up in nearby suburbs Cambridge and Newton. She is the eldest of three daughters of Glenn and Sara Fisher Ellison, both economics professors at MIT. She says she and her siblings were exposed to economics early, learning Bayesian statistics in primary school. At age 8, Ellison gifted her father with an economic study of stuffed animal prices from Toys "R" Us for his birthday. At Bigelow Middle School Ellison and her younger sister Anna competed with the math team coached by their father. In 2008, Ellison received top honors in the American Mathematics Competitions. As a Newton North High School student, she represented the US in the 2011 International Linguistics Olympiad and received an honorable mention and an award for "best solution". Ellison competed in the Greater Boston Math League with her high school and served as the team's captain. She represented Newton several times in the Math Prize for Girls. During her senior year, Ellison was accepted into the MIT PRIMES after-school program. She graduated in 2012 with a National Merit Scholarship from the math department, the Ron Barndt Award. In the school newspaper's graduation edition she told her freshman self to "Join math team." 

Ellison graduated from Stanford University in 2016 with a bachelor's degree in mathematics. While at Stanford, she scored in the top 500 students in the 2013, 2014, and 2015 Putnam Competitions. As a freshman, Ellison developed an interest in effective altruism, a data-based philanthropic movement. She joined Stanford's effective altruism club and served as its vice president.

Career 
While attending Stanford, Ellison began her career in quantitative trading with two internships at Jane Street, a proprietary trading firm in New York City. In September 2016, Ellison joined Jane Street full-time as an equities trader in a cohort mentored by Sam Bankman-Fried, who left the firm a year later to serve as director of development at the Centre for Effective Altruism in Berkeley, California. 

Ellison and Bankman-Fried bonded over interest in effective altruism and remained in contact. In February 2018, while visiting the San Francisco Bay Area, Ellison met Bankman-Fried for coffee where he pitched her on joining Alameda Research, a cryptocurrency hedge fund co-founded in November 2017 by Bankman-Fried and effective altruism colleague Tara Mac Aulay. Ellison joined the following month. She said her "blind leap" was based on excitement over arbitraging cryptocurrencies and the potential to further her pursuit of earning to give. When she joined, Ellison had more experience than most of the other traders. She became co-CEO along with Sam Trabucco in October 2021. She became the sole CEO of Alameda Research in August 2022 after Trabucco stepped down.

On 6 November 2022, after CoinDesk raised concerns about the balance sheet of Alameda Research and its relationship with FTX, Ellison said that the balance sheet information which had been released only included some of Alameda's assets, and that the firm had more than $10 billion of additional assets. According to anonymous sources cited by the Wall Street Journal and The New York Times, Ellison was in a video meeting with employees on 9 November 2022; she admitted there that FTX had used customer money to help Alameda meet its liabilities and that she, Bankman-Fried, and two other FTX executives, Nishad Singh and Gary Wang, were aware of the circumstances.

Ellison was terminated from her position by John J. Ray III after FTX, Alameda Research, and more than 100 related companies filed for Chapter 11 bankruptcy.

Legal proceedings
In December 2022, Ellison hired Stephanie Avakian of law firm WilmerHale as her lead attorney. On December 18, Ellison pleaded guilty in the Southern District of New York to conspiracy to commit wire fraud on customers of FTX, conspiracy to commit wire fraud on lenders of Alameda Research, wire fraud on lenders of Alameda Research, conspiracy to commit commodities fraud, conspiracy to commit securities fraud, and conspiracy to commit money laundering. On that day, FTX co-founder Gary Wang also pleaded guilty to several charges. A transcript of her plea hearing was unsealed on December 23, revealing she had admitted to judge Ronnie Abrams that she and others conspired to steal billions of dollars from customers of FTX, while misleading its investors and lenders. Ellison told Judge Abrams that Sam Bankman-Fried and other FTX executives had received billions of dollars in secret loans from Alameda Research.

Personal life 
Accounts from unspecified former employees about a romantic relationship with colleague Sam Bankman-Fried were reported. Business Insider said that Ellison's alleged relationship with Bankman-Fried was singled out by CoinDesk. Bankman-Fried told Good Morning America his relationship with Ellison was brief.

It is widely believed that Ellison operated an unsigned Tumblr blog. Ellison never claimed ownership, but the blog linked directly to Ellison's Twitter account and Bankman-Fried told the New York Times she was the author.

Ellison contributed along with FTX senior employees to the FTX Foundation's Future Fund, which planned to fund philanthropic endeavors before ceasing operations when its own senior staff resigned citing inability to honor grants and concerns about the legitimacy of its funding, leaving some beneficiaries concerned whether they will owe grant money back.

Recognition
 2022: Named in Forbes 30 Under 30 - North America - Finance

References 

1994 births
Living people
American chief executives
People associated with cryptocurrency
People associated with effective altruism
Stanford University alumni
American women chief executives
Newton North High School alumni
American expatriates in the Bahamas
Jane Street Capital people
Businesspeople from Massachusetts
21st-century American businesspeople
21st-century American businesswomen